Spaceballs is a 1987 American space opera parody film co-written, produced and directed by Mel Brooks. It is primarily a parody of the original Star Wars trilogy, but also parodies other sci-fi films and popular franchises including Star Trek, Alien, The Wizard of Oz, 2001: A Space Odyssey, Planet of the Apes, and Transformers. The film stars Bill Pullman, John Candy and Rick Moranis, with the supporting cast including Daphne Zuniga, Dick Van Patten, George Wyner, Lorene Yarnell, and the voice of Joan Rivers. In addition to Brooks playing a dual role, the film also features Brooks regulars Dom DeLuise and Rudy De Luca in cameo appearances.

In Spaceballs, heroic mercenary Lone Starr (Pullman) and his alien sidekick Barf (Candy) rescue Princess Vespa (Zuniga) of Druidia and her droid, Dot Matrix (Yarnell, voiced by Rivers), from being captured by the Spaceballs, led by President Skroob (Brooks), who want to use Vespa as ransom to obtain Druidia's air for their own planet. However, the heroes get stranded on a desert moon, where they encounter the wise Yogurt (also Brooks), who teaches Starr about the metaphysical power known as "the Schwartz". Meanwhile, Spaceball commanders Dark Helmet (Moranis) and Colonel Sandurz (Wyner) lead the search for them, but are hindered by their own incompetence.

The film was released by Metro-Goldwyn-Mayer on June 24, 1987. Despite initially getting a mixed reception from critics and audiences, it has since become a cult classic, and is one of Brooks's most popular and well-known films.

Plot
Planet Spaceball, led by the incompetent President Skroob, has squandered all of its fresh air. Skroob schemes to force King Roland of the neighboring planet Druidia to give them the code to the shield that protects Druidia, allowing them to steal all their air, by kidnapping his daughter Princess Vespa on the day of her arranged marriage to the narcoleptic Prince Valium. Skroob sends the villainous Dark Helmet to complete this task with Spaceball One, an impossibly huge ship commanded by Colonel Sandurz. Before they can arrive, Vespa abandons her wedding and flees the planet in her Mercedes spaceship with her droid of honor, Dot Matrix.

Roland contacts mercenary Lone Starr and his "mawg" (half man, half dog) companion Barf, offering a lucrative reward to retrieve Vespa before she is captured. Lone Starr readily accepts, as he is in major debt to gangster Pizza the Hutt. In their Winnebago spaceship, "Eagle 5", Lone Starr and Barf are able to reach Vespa before Spaceball One, rescue both her and Dot, then escape. Spaceball One tries to follow at light-speed, but Helmet orders the ship to "ludicrous speed", causing it to overshoot the escapees by a large distance.

Out of fuel, Lone Starr is forced to crash-land on the nearby "desert moon of Vega". The group travels on foot in order to evade the Spaceballs, but they eventually pass out under the blazing sun. They are found by the Dinks, a group of diminutive sparkly brown-clad aliens, and are taken to a cave occupied by the sage Yogurt, who introduces the group and the audience to the film's merchandising campaign. Yogurt later teaches Lone Starr about the metaphysical power known as "the Schwartz", and gives him a ring which can be used to control the "Upside" of the Schwartz. During this time, Lone Starr and Vespa develop romantic feelings for each other, but Vespa insists she can only marry a prince.

Helmet and Sandurz break the fourth wall by using a VHS copy of Spaceballs to discover Vespa's location, and Helmet orders Spaceball One to go to the moon of Vega. When Helmet discovers Yogurt's lair, he lures Vespa out by pretending to be Roland and captures both her and Dot, taking them back to planet Spaceball. He then threatens to reverse Vespa's nose job, forcing Roland to reveal the code to Druidia's shield. Skroob, Helmet and Sandurz take "Spaceball One"  to Druidia, while Lone Starr and Barf rescue Vespa and Dot from the Spaceballs prison complex. When they arrive at Druidia, Spaceball One transforms into Mega Maid, a Statue of Liberty-like colossal robot maid with a vacuum cleaner. The vacuum is activated and begins sucking the air off the planet. When the vacuum bag is almost full, Lone Starr uses the Schwartz to reverse the vacuum, blowing the air back onto the planet.

The group then enters Mega Maid and attempts to destroy it. Lone Starr and Helmet fight using lightsaber-like weapons created by their Schwartz-rings, until the former loses his ring. Yogurt speaks to Lone Starr, telling him that the ring was a Cracker Jack box prize and that the real Schwartz is inside him. Lone Starr defeats Helmet, causing him to inadvertently strike the self-destruct button. Lone Starr and his friends escape the ship, while Skroob, Helmet, and Sandurz fail to reach any escape pods in time, trapping them in the robot's head as the ship explodes. They subsequently crash-land on a nearby planet, much to the chagrin of its Planet of the Apes-like population.

With Lone Starr's debt to Pizza nullified by the gangster's untimely death, he returns Vespa to Roland and leaves, taking only enough money to cover his expenses. After a lunch break at a diner and a strange incident involving an alien and an astronaut similar to the events in Alien, Lone Starr finds a final message from Yogurt, informing him that the medallion necklace Lone Starr has been wearing reveals that he is a prince, and thus eligible to marry Vespa. He reaches Druidia in time to stop her wedding to Valium, announces his royal lineage, then marries Vespa.

The film ends with Eagle 5 flying off into the stars, leaving its glowing trails of exhaust revealing a message: "MAY THE SCHWARTZ BE WITH YOU".

Cast
 Bill Pullman as Lone Starr, mercenary who travels the galaxy in his flying 1986 Winnebago Chieftain 33, Eagle 5. He is a parody of Luke Skywalker and Han Solo.
 John Candy as Barf, Lone Starr's "mawg"  (half-man, half-dog) sidekick. He is a parody of Chewbacca.
 Daphne Zuniga as Princess Vespa, the spoiled princess of Planet Druidia. She is a parody of Princess Leia.
 Joan Rivers as the voice of Dot Matrix, Princess Vespa's droid of honor and guardian. She is a parody of C-3PO.
 Lorene Yarnell provided Dot Matrix's on-screen physical performance.
 Rick Moranis as Dark Helmet, the Spaceballs' short-statured, bratty, and often childish chief enforcer, who can wield the "downside" of the Schwartz. He is a parody of Darth Vader.
 Mel Brooks as:
 Yogurt, the wise and powerful keeper of the Schwartz. He is a parody of Yoda.
 President Skroob, the incompetent leader of Planet Spaceball. He is a parody of Emperor Palpatine, with his name “Skroob” being an anagram of "Brooks".
 George Wyner as Colonel Sandurz, the commander of Spaceball One. He is a parody of Grand Moff Tarkin and his name is a reference to Colonel Sanders.
 Dick Van Patten as King Roland, the ruler of Planet Druidia and Princess Vespa's father.
 Michael Winslow as a radar technician on Spaceball One who can re-enact the radar's sounds.
 Ronny Graham as the minister.
 Jim J. Bullock as Prince Valium, a narcoleptic prince.
 Leslie Bevis as Commanderette Zircon.
 Sandy Helberg as Dr. Irving Schlotkin.
 Brenda Strong as Nurse Gretchen, Dr. Schlotkin's assistant.
 Dom DeLuise as the voice of Pizza the Hutt: A Hutt crime lord made out of pizza. He is a parody of Jabba the Hutt and his name is a reference to Pizza Hut.
 Richard Karron (original takes) and Rick Lazzarini (reshoots and final takes) portrayed Pizza's on-screen presence.  Lazzarini originally spoke the lines of Pizza; DeLuise later dubbed his own voice over those lines.
 Rudy De Luca as Vinnie: Pizza's robotic subordinate. He is a parody of the 80's TV personality Max Headroom.
 Rhonda Shear as a woman in the diner.
 Jeff MacGregor as Snotty, based on Scotty from Star Trek. MacGregor's role is uncredited.

John Hurt makes a cameo appearance credited as himself, parodying his character Gilbert Kane's death in the film Alien (1979). Various actors and comedians appear in unnamed roles, with Sal Viscuso, Michael Pniewski, Stephen Tobolowsky, Robert Prescott, Tom Dreesen, Rick Ducommun, Rob Paulsen, Tommy Swerdlow, and Tim Russ all appearing as soldiers of Dark Helmet. Additional unnamed appearances include Dey Young as a waitress, Jack Riley as a newsman, Ken Olfson as the head usher, and Bryan O'Byrne as an organist. Denise and Dian Gallup appear as Charlene and Marlene. Ed Gale, Felix Silla, Tony Cox, Antonio Hoyos, Arturo Gil, and John Kennedy Hayden appear as the Dinks (based on the Jawas).

Production

When Brooks developed Spaceballs, he wanted his parody to be as close to the original as possible. Even though the Yogurt character (Mel Brooks) mentions merchandising in the film, Brooks's deal with George Lucas on parodying Star Wars was that no Spaceballs action figures be made. According to Brooks, "[Lucas] said, 'Your [action figures] are going to look like mine.' I said OK." However, this agreement inspired Brooks to write Yogurt's "Merchandising" scene and include multiple Spaceballs-branded products at other points in the film, such as placemats and toilet paper.

Brooks also had Lucas's company handle the post-production, saying, "I was playing ball with the people who could have said no." Lucas later sent Brooks a note saying how much he loved the film, including its story structure, and that he "was afraid [he] would bust something from laughing".

Pullman got the part of Lone Starr when Brooks and his wife Anne Bancroft saw him in a play—he had never seen Star Wars prior to filming. Brooks had been unsuccessfully trying to sign on big-name actors such as Tom Cruise and Tom Hanks for the film. Pullman said,

I think [Mel] was hurt that they didn't take him up on it ... but then it attract[ed] two of the big comics at that time: John Candy and Rick Moranis. Once that was secured, then he said, "Heck, I'll get somebody nobody knows!" And I got a chance to do it.

Zuniga initially found Brooks's film parodies "too crass and not too funny", but after working with Brooks, she said, "I have this image of Mel as totally wacko and out to lunch. And he is. But he's also really perceptive, real sensitive in ways that make actors respond."

Music
An official soundtrack was released on Atlantic Records on LP, CD, and cassette, featuring many of the songs heard in the film, as well as three score cues by frequent Brooks collaborator John Morris. The track list is as follows:

 "Spaceballs Main Title Theme" – John Morris
 "My Heart Has a Mind of Its Own" – Jeffrey Osborne and Kim Carnes; the song was made into a hit in 1990 by Sally Moore (U.S. AC #42).
 "Heartstrings" – Berlin
 "Spaceballs Love Theme" (Instrumental) – John Morris
 "The Winnebago Crashes"/"The Spaceballs Build Mega-Maid" – John Morris
 "Spaceballs" – The Spinners
 "Hot Together" – The Pointer Sisters
 "Good Enough" – Van Halen
 "Wanna Be Loved by You" – Ladyfire

"Raise Your Hands" by Bon Jovi is also used prominently in the film.

In the film the Dinks (based on Jawas) perform the 1914 marching song "Colonel Bogey March", though they sing "Dink dink, dink dink dink dink dink dink...Dink dink" rather than whistle, parodying the scene from The Bridge on the River Kwai.

In 2006, La-La Land Records released Spaceballs – The 19th Anniversary Edition CD of the film's score, with bonus tracks of alternate takes and tracks not used in the film.

Reception

Box office
The film had an estimated $22.7 million budget, and ultimately grossed $38,119,483 during its run in the United States, taking in $6,613,837 on its opening weekend, finishing behind Dragnet.

Critical reception
The film has received mixed reviews from critics. Rotten Tomatoes reports that, as of 2023, 57% of critics have given positive reviews based on 46 reviews with an average rating of 6.4/10. The site's consensus reads; "There's fine spoofery and amusing characters in Spaceballs, though it's a far cry from Mel Brooks's peak era." On Metacritic, the film has a weighted average score of 46%, based on 14 reviews.  Audiences polled by CinemaScore gave the film an average grade of "B–" on an A+ to F scale.

At the time of the film's release, Roger Ebert of the Chicago Sun-Times gave the film 2.5 stars out of 4, and remarked "I enjoyed a lot of the movie, but I kept thinking I was at a revival… it should have been made several years ago, before our appetite for Star Wars satires had been completely exhausted." Gene Siskel of the Chicago Tribune gave the film 3 out of 4 stars, saying that there were "just enough funny visual gags to recommend this wildly uneven film." Variety said that the film was a misguided parody and not very funny.

The film won Worst Picture at the 1987 Stinkers Bad Movie Awards.

Home media
Spaceballs was first made available on VHS and LaserDisc in February 1988; they were re-released in the late 1990s. The VHS edition was issued twice; the latter edition was presented in widescreen. Meanwhile, the laserdisc also gained a commentary track with Brooks; this was transferred over to the DVD and Blu-ray releases. The film was first released on DVD on April 25, 2000. This version also contained "the making of..." documentary and a collectible "making-of" booklet. The film was then released in the "Collectors Edition" on May 3, 2005. This edition contained more extras including the documentary and the video conversation about the making of the film with Brooks and Thomas Meehan. On August 7, 2012, the "25th Anniversary Edition" was released on Blu-ray containing many of the same bonus features as the 2005 DVD release with the addition of a new featurette. An Ultra HD Blu-ray edition of the film was released on April 12, 2021 by Kino Lorber, with all of the special features from previous home video releases included.

In other media
 A novelization for the film was released on June 1, 1987.
 Spaceballs was developed into an animated television show which debuted in September 2008 as Spaceballs: The Animated Series on G4 (US) and Super Channel (Canada).
 Moranis claimed in a 2013 interview that he and Brooks had discussed a potential sequel, with Moranis pitching the title Spaceballs III: The Search for Spaceballs II. However, he and Brooks were unable to structure a deal that would allow the project to move forward. In February 2015, Brooks said that he would like to make a sequel to be released after the next Star Wars film and hoped that Moranis would reprise his role. This proposed film, Brooks said, may be called Spaceballs 2: The Search for More Money. However, in February 2020, Bill Pullman said during an interview with Daily Blast Live, "It's up to Mel. Ask him if he has too much money and that's why he doesn't do it."
 In the episode Robot Chicken: Star Wars of the American adult sketch comedy television series Robot Chicken the segment George Lucas At The Convention features a Star Wars fan wearing a Barf costume from Spaceballs.
 Moranis vocally reprised his role as Dark Helmet in the episode "Spaceballs" of the American sitcom The Goldbergs.<ref>"Spaceballs". The Goldbergs. Season 5. Episode 21. May 9, 2018. ABC.</ref>

ImpactSpaceballs has made an impact on popular culture and been used as a referent and inspiration in other properties.

Tesla Motors has used Spaceballs' starship speeds (Light Speed, Ridiculous Speed, Ludicrous Speed, Plaid Speed) as inspiration for naming their acceleration modes. In homage to Spaceballs, Tesla has Ludicrous Mode for acceleration beyond its Insane Mode, and Plaid Mode, overtop Ludicrous.

As part of its merchandising, The Boring Company sold 20,000 "flamethrowers" in 2018 inspired by the Spaceballs merchandising scene.

A clip from the film, alongside clips of other Star Wars parody works, was used in a "special look" internet video used to promote Star Wars: The Rise of Skywalker in order to show the cultural impact of Star Wars.

Props
A -scale model of the Winnebago, Eagle 5, was auctioned on December 11, 2018. The model was created by film special effects designer Grant McCune, who also created models for Star Wars and Star Trek. The model makes an appearance early in the film with the introduction of Barf and Lone Starr. The model, along with other special effects artifacts from then-current films such as Masters of the Universe and Jaws: The Revenge'', was displayed at Chicago's Museum of Science and Industry in the summer of 1988.

References

External links

 
 
 
 
 

1987 films
1980s adventure films
1980s buddy comedy films
1980s parody films
1980s science fiction comedy films
American adventure comedy films
American buddy comedy films
American science fiction comedy films
American space adventure films
American parody films
American robot films
American satirical films
Faster-than-light travel in fiction
Films about royalty
Films about extraterrestrial life
Films adapted into television shows
Films set on fictional planets
Puppet films
Flying cars in fiction
Jewish comedy and humor
Parody films based on Star Wars
Self-reflexive films
Teleportation in fiction
Films directed by Mel Brooks
Films produced by Mel Brooks
Films scored by John Morris
Films set on spacecraft
Films with screenplays by Mel Brooks
Films with screenplays by Thomas Meehan (writer)
Films set in outer space
Brooksfilms films
Metro-Goldwyn-Mayer films
1987 comedy films
1980s English-language films
1980s American films